Moonbabies at the Ballroom is the Moonbabies third full-length album, released in 2004.

Track listing 
 21st Century Heart - 2:26
 War on Sound - 3:45
 Take Me to the Ballroom - 3:57
 Don't Ya Know? - 3:51
 Cocobelle - 4:02
 Ratatouille - 1:25
 Walking on My Feet - 3:57
 Shout It Out - 3:46
 The 9th - 4:23
 Weekend A-Go-Go - 5:57
 Dancing in the Sky - 5:25

References 

2007 albums